Daddy Showkey is a veteran Nigerian galala singer. His genre of music is called ghetto dance or simply ghetto. He was popular in Ajegunle in the late 1990s. He was born as John  Odafe Asiemo but is known as Daddy Showkey all over the Ghetto. He hails from  Olomoro Kingdom in Isoko South LGA of Delta State.

Singles 
1996 "Diana"
1991 "Fire Fire"
2000 "The Name"
2011 "The Chicken"
2011 "Sandra"
2011 "Young girl"
2011 "Ragga Hip hop"
2011 "Asiko"
2011 "Mayazeno"
2011 "Girl's cry"
2011 "What's gonna be gonna be"
2011 "Welcome"
2011 "Ghetto Soldier"
2011 "Jehovah"
2011 "Dancing scene"
2017 "One Day"
2017 "Shokey Again"

Endorsement 
In 2018, Daddy Showkey became a brand ambassador for Real Estate Management Revelation Property Group in Lagos State.

He was among several celebrities like Alex Ekubo, Ikechukwu Ogbonna, Belindah Effah, Mary Lazarus and Charles Inojie.

Albums 
2011 "The Name"somebody call my name showckey
2011 "Welcome"

References

20th-century Nigerian male singers
Living people
Year of birth missing (living people)
Place of birth missing (living people)
21st-century Nigerian male singers